The Nyctemerina are a subtribe of woolly bear moths in the family Erebidae.

Taxonomy
The subtribe was previously classified as the tribe Nyctemerini of the former family Arctiidae. Some authors merge the subtribe into the related Callimorphina, but Nyctemerini is an elder name.

Genera
Afrocoscinia
Agaltara
Caryatis
Diota
Galtara
Ischnarctia
Karschiola
Neuroxena
Pseudogaltara
Xylecata

Argina generic group
Alytarchia
Argina
Mangina

Afrotropical genera of the Nyctemera group, that were separated from the Oriental stem
Afronyctemera
Chiromachla
Podomachla

Oriental and Australian taxa of generic level that are traditionally considered as subgenera of
Nyctemera:
Nyctemera (Arctata)
Nyctemera (Coleta)
Nyctemera (Deilemera)
Nyctemera (Luctuosana)
Nyctemera (Nyctemera)
Nyctemera (Orphanos)
Nyctemera (Tritomera)

Utetheisa is sometimes placed in Nyctemerina, sometimes in the Callimorphina (if these are treated as distinct subtribe).

References

Main articles on Oriental and Australian Nyctemera 

 de Vos, R. 1994 [1995]: Nyctemera groenendaeli spec. nov. from New Guinea (Lepidoptera: Arctiidae, Nyctemerina). Nachrichten des Entomologischen Vereins Apollo, N.F. 15 (4): 481-489.
 de Vos, R. 1995: A revision of Nyctemera consobrina (Hopffer, 1874) with redescription of three subspecies (Lepidoptera: Arctiidae, Nyctemerinae). Nachrichten des Entomologischen Vereins Apollo, N.F. 16 (1): 81-93.
 de Vos, R. 1996: Nyctemera pseudokala sp. nov. and N. mastrigti sp. nov., two new species from Indonesia (Lepidoptera: Arctiidae, Nyctemerinae). Nachrichten des Entomologischen Vereins Apollo, N.F. 17 (3): 301-311.
 de Vos, R. 1997: A revision of Nyctemera kebeae (Bethune-Baker, 1904) (with descriptions of two new subspecies) and N. warmasina (Bethune-Baker, 1910) (Lepidoptera: Arctiidae, Nyctemerinae). Nachrichten des Entomologischen Vereins Apollo, N.F. 18 (1): 1-12.
 de Vos, R. 1997: The identity of Nyctemera simulatrix Walker, 1864 (Lepidoptera: Arctiidae, Nyctemerinae). Nachrichten des Entomologischen Vereins Apollo, N.F. 18 (2-3): 205-210.
 de Vos, R. 2002: Revision of the Nyctemera evergista group (=subgenus Deilemera Hübner) (Lepidoptera: Arctiidae, Arctiinae, Nyctemerini). Nachrichten des Entomologischen Vereins Apollo, N.F. 23 (1/2): 7-32.
 de Vos, R. 2007: Revision of the Nyctemera clathratum complex (Lepidoptera: Arctiidae). Tijdschrift voor Entomologie 150: 39-54.
 de Vos, R. 2007: The Utetheisa species of the subgenera Pitasila, Atasca and Raanya subgen. n. (Insecta, Lepidoptera: Arctiidae). Aldrovandia 3: 31-120.
 
 de Vos, R., Dubatolov, V. V. 2010: Nyctemerini. In: V. V. Dubatolov, Tiger-moths of Eurasia (Lepidoptera, Arctiidae). Neue Entomologische Nachrichten 65: 11-18.

 
Lepidoptera subtribes
Taxa named by William Kirby (entomologist)